Rama Varma XVII GCIE (c. 1861 – 23 May 1941) was the ruler of the Kingdom of Cochin from 25 March 1932 to 23 May 1941.

Reign
Rama Varma ascended the throne on the death of Rama Varma XVI. The Cochin harbour was expanded and the Ernakulam High Court was established during his reign. Rama Varma also showed keen interest in religious and spiritual matters.

Death 

Rama Varma died at Chowwara on 23 May 1941.

References 

 

Rulers of Cochin
Knights Grand Commander of the Order of the Indian Empire
1861 births
1941 deaths